The 1985 Hamilton Tiger-Cats season was the 28th season for the team in the Canadian Football League and their 36th overall. The Tiger-Cats finished in 1st place in the East Division with an 8–8 record which marked the first time in league history that a team finished in first place without a winning record. The team appeared in the 73rd Grey Cup game, but lost to the BC Lions.

Preseason

Regular season

Season standings

Season schedule

Postseason

Schedule

Grey Cup

References

Hamilton Tiger-cats Season, 1985
Hamilton Tiger-Cats seasons
James S. Dixon Trophy championship seasons
1985 Canadian Football League season by team